Gabbiella balovalensis is a species of small freshwater snails with an operculum, aquatic prosobranch gastropod mollusks in the family Bithyniidae.

This species is found in Malawi and Zambia. Its natural habitat is freshwater lakes.

References

Bithyniidae
Gastropods described in 1968
Taxonomy articles created by Polbot